Luis de Torres (died 1493) was Christopher Columbus's interpreter on his first voyage to America.

De Torres was a converso, apparently born Yosef ben HaLevi HaIvri chosen by Columbus for his knowledge of Hebrew, Chaldaic, and Arabic. After arriving at Cuba, which he supposed to be the Asian coast, Columbus sent de Torres and the sailor Rodrigo de Jerez on an expedition inland on November 2, 1492. Their task was to explore the country, contact its ruler, and gather information about the Asian emperor described by Marco Polo as the "Great Khan". The two men were received with great honors in a village, and returned four days later. They reported on the native custom of drying leaves, inserting them in cane pipes, burning them, and inhaling the smoke: a reference to the use of tobacco.

When Columbus set off for Spain on January 4, 1493, Luis de Torres was among the 39 men who stayed behind at the settlement of La Navidad founded on the island of Hispaniola. Coming back by the end of that year, Columbus learnt that the whole garrison had been wiped out by internal strife and by an Indian attack.

Further reading
 Columbus’s Diaries in the original Spanish
 Alicia B. Gould y Quincy, "Nueva lista documentada de los tripulantes de Colón en 1492: Luis de Torres", Boletín de la Real Academia de la Historia 90 (1927), p. 541-552.

References 

1493 deaths
Christopher Columbus
Interpreters
Spanish explorers
Spanish Roman Catholics
15th-century Spanish people
Year of birth unknown
Conversos